Reina Nagata (Japanese: 永田　怜奈, born February 1, 1992) is a Japanese beauty pageant titleholder who was crowned Miss Earth Japan 2014that gives her the right to represent Japan at Miss Earth 2014 in November. She was crowned by Miss Earth Japan 2013, Yu Horikawa.

Pageantry

Miss Earth Japan
Upon winning, Reina has been involved in some of the environmental activities in Japan. One of which is Reina Nagata had a meeting with the Senior Vice-Minister of the Environment Tomokatsu Kitagawa. They discussed the environmental activities and campaigns for the preservation of Japan's National Parks.

Miss Earth 2014

By winning Miss Earth Japan, Reina will fly to the Philippines in November to compete with almost 100 other candidates to be Alyz Henrich's successor as Miss Earth. 

As a Miss Earth delegate, an environmental advocacy is must. When she was asked about her advocacy for the pageant, she answered, "What is your environmental advocacy and why did you choose this?
I chose the problem of garbage. As our lifestyles have become more comfortable, the cities beautiful, and material things plentiful, on the other hand, the amount of garbage that has to be dealt with also increases. Especially in Japan, there's only enough space to deal with garbage for the next ten years. I think it's now necessary to create a lifestyle that doesn't produce garbage for both Japan and the whole world."

External links
 Reina at Miss Earth Official Website
 Miss Earth Japan 2014 Eco-Beauty Video

References

1992 births
Living people
Miss Earth 2014 contestants
Japanese beauty pageant winners